Dikerogammarus is a genus of amphipod crustaceans, containing the following species:

Dikerogammarus aralychensis (Birstein, 1932)
Dikerogammarus batalonicus Ponyi, 1955
Dikerogammarus bispinosus Martynov, 1925
Dikerogammarus caspius (Pallas, 1771)
Dikerogammarus fluviatilis Martynov, 1919
Dikerogammarus gruberi Mateus & Mateus, 1990
Dikerogammarus haemobaphes (Eichwald, 1841)
Dikerogammarus istanbulensis Özbek & Özkan, 2011
Dikerogammarus oskari Birstein, 1945
Dikerogammarus villosus (Sowinsky, 1894)

References

Gammaridae
Taxa named by Thomas Roscoe Rede Stebbing